El Hafsia Mosque  is a small mosque in the Hafsia Hood in the north of the medina of Tunis.

Localization
It is located in 23 Achour Street.

History 
According to the panel at the entrance of the mosque, it was built during the reign of Muhammad VIII al-Amin. The construction started in 1954 thanks to the grant offered by Salah Ben Ali Ben Belgacem Bouzinbila El Douiri, and finished two years later in 1956.
It was restored in 2011.

Etymology
The mosque got its name from the hood in which it is located that was originally called El Hara or the Jewish hood.

References 

Mosques in Tunis
11th-century mosques